Jika Jika Province was an electorate of the Victorian Legislative Council in Victoria, Australia. It existed as a two-member electorate from 1985 to 2006, with members holding alternating eight-year terms. It was a safe seat for the Labor Party throughout its existence. It was abolished from the 2006 state election in the wake of the Bracks Labor government's reform of the Legislative Council.

It was located in the northern suburbs of Melbourne. In 2002, when it was last contested, it covered an area of 108 km2 and included the suburbs of Bundoora, Fairfield, Greensborough, Mill Park, Northcote, Preston, Reservoir, South Morang and Thornbury.

Members for Jika Jika Province

Election results

References

Former electoral provinces of Victoria (Australia)
1985 establishments in Australia
2006 disestablishments in Australia